Richard Fleming may refer to:
Richard Fleming (bishop) (c. 1385–1431), English clergyman and bishop of Lincoln
Richard Fleming (priest), Dean of Ontario
Richard Fleming (Coronation Street), a fictional character on the British television show Coronation Street
Richard E. Fleming (1917–1942), United States Marine Corps officer and Medal of Honor recipient

See also